Ronkainen is a Finnish surname. Notable people with the surname include:

 Ilkka Ronkainen (born 1940s), Finnish/American organizational theorist
 Jari Ronkainen, Finnish politician
 Mika Ronkainen (born 1970), Finnish film director
 Mikko Ronkainen (born 1978), Finnish freestyle skier
 Rauno Ronkainen (born 1964), Finnish TV and film cinematographer and cameraman
 Taneli Ronkainen (born 1995), Finnish ice hockey player

Finnish-language surnames